Quinton Meaders (born December 21, 1983) is a former professional defensive back. He was signed by the Calgary Stampeders as a street free agent in 2009. He played college football at Itawamba Community College.

On May 28, 2010, Meaders signed with the Toronto Argonauts, but was later released by the team on June 5, 2010.

In 2012, Meaders signed with his hometown Mississippi Hound Dogs.

References

1984 births
Living people
Sportspeople from Tupelo, Mississippi
Canadian football defensive backs
American players of Canadian football
Calgary Stampeders players
Toronto Argonauts players
Mississippi Hound Dogs players